Saros cycle series 135 for solar eclipses occurs at the Moon's ascending node, repeating every 18 years, 11 days. Solar Saros 135 contains 71 events in which of 18 will be partial eclipses and 53 will be umbral eclipses (45 annular, 2 hybrid, 6 total). All eclipses in this series occurs at the Moon's ascending node.

This solar saros is linked to Lunar Saros 128.

On Monday, December 24, 1601, was the smallest annular solar eclipse in the 2nd millennium, with an eclipse magnitude of only 0.90785, just 0.002% larger than the solar eclipse of November 12, 1683 BC, was the smallest annular solar eclipse of thousands of years, with an eclipse magnitude of only 0.90783.

The solar eclipse of January 15, 1638, was an annular solar eclipse of Solar Saros 135 that occurred only 43 minutes before apogee.

The longest annular solar eclipse on the 2nd millennium was on December 14, 1955 (Saros 141), with a duration of 12 minutes, 9.17 seconds, while the smallest annular solar eclipse on the 2nd millennium was on December 24, 1601 (Saros 135), with an eclipse magnitude of only 0.90785.

The solar eclipse of November 12, 1683 BC, was the smallest annular solar eclipse for thousands of years, with an eclipse magnitude of only 0.90783. The factors that made this such a smallest annular solar eclipse were:

 The Earth being very near perihelion (closest approach from the Sun in its elliptical orbit, making its angular diameter nearly as large as possible). This occurs around January 3rd.
 The Moon being nearly exactly at apogee (making its angular diameter as small as possible). The moment of greatest eclipse was just a day before apogee.
 The midpoint of the eclipse being Sun very close to the horizon, where the eclipse magnitude is the smallest.

Umbral eclipses
Umbral eclipses (annular, total and hybrid) can be further classified as either: 1) Central (two limits), 2) Central (one limit) or 3) Non-Central (one limit). The statistical distribution of these classes in Saros series 135 appears in the following table.

Saros 135

Saros 135 

It is a part of Saros cycle 135, repeating every 18 years, 11 days, containing 71 events. The series started with partial solar eclipse on July 5, 1331. It contains annular eclipses from October 21, 1511 through February 24, 2305, hybrid eclipses on March 8, 2323 and March 18, 2341 and total eclipses from March 29, 2359 through May 22, 2449. The series ends at member 71 as a partial eclipse on August 17, 2593. The longest duration of totality will be 2 minutes, 27 seconds on May 12, 2431.

Events

References 
  https://eclipse.gsfc.nasa.gov/SEsaros/SEsaros135.html

External links
Saros cycle 135 - Information and visualization

Solar saros series